The Millennium Challenge Corporation (MCC) is a bilateral United States foreign aid agency established by the U.S. Congress in 2004. It is an independent agency separate from the State Department and USAID. It provides grants to countries that have been determined to have good economic policies and potential for economic growth. The country qualification process is objective, involving scores provided by third parties in 20 different areas. An eligible country must apply for a grant with a specific project in mind.

History
At the Inter-American Development Bank meeting on March 14, 2002, President George W. Bush called for a new compact for development with accountability for both rich and poor countries. He pledged to increase development assistance by 50% by fiscal year 2006 (which, by the end of 2004, doubled and was to double again by 2010). Other development programs like USAID have been thought to suffer from many different and sometimes conflicting goals, which often are a result of political pressures, and for not delivering long-term economic improvements.

MCC was authorized in 2004 with bipartisan support. Its guiding principles are:

 Competitive selection: Before a country can become eligible to receive assistance, MCC's Board examines its performance on 20 policy indicators and selects compact-eligible countries based on policy performance.
 Country-led solutions: MCC requires selected countries to identify their priorities for achieving sustainable economic growth and poverty reduction. Countries develop their MCC proposals in broad consultation within their society. MCC teams then work in close partnership to help countries refine a program.
 Country-led implementation: MCC administers the Millennium Challenge Account (MCA). When a country is awarded a compact, it sets up its own local MCA accountable entity to manage and oversee all aspects of implementation. Monitoring of funds is rigorous and transparent, often through independent fiscal agents.

Leadership
The first CEO of the Millennium Challenge Corporation was Paul Applegarth, a finance manager with experience in emerging markets. Applegarth was followed by John Danilovich, a business executive who had served as the U.S. Ambassador to Costa Rica from 2001 to 2004 and then U.S. Ambassador to Brazil. On November 20, 2009, Daniel W. Yohannes, an Ethiopian-born American business person, was confirmed by the Senate as the CEO. He was appointed in May 2014 as US Ambassador to the OECD and succeeded by Dana Hyde who was CEO through January 2017. Sean Cairncross was confirmed as CEO under the Trump administration in June 2019 after four acting CEOs.In January 2021 Mahmoud Bah became Millennium Challenge Corporation Acting CEO. On February 16, 2022, Alice P. Albright was sworn in as CEO.

The MCC Board is composed of its CEO, the U.S. Secretary of State (board chair), the Secretary of Treasury (vice chair), the administrator of USAID, the U.S. Trade Representative, and other private-sector or development-related officials.

Selection indicators
A country is considered eligible for a compact (aid grant) if selected as eligible by the Board of Directors.  The Board of Directors chooses countries based on three factors: policy performance as measured by the selection indicators on MCC's scorecard, the opportunity to reduce poverty in a country, and the availability of funds.  In order to pass the scorecard a country must pass 10 of the 20 indicators, pass either the Political Rights or Civil Liberties Indicators, and pass the Control of Corruption indicator.  For 16 of the 20 indicators, a country passes if its score exceeds the median score of its peer group.  The remaining 4 indicators (Political Rights, Civil Liberties, Immunization Rates (if the median is above 90%, otherwise it is median based), and Inflation) are scored based on a static threshold.

All 20 indicators are compiled by third parties with no connection to MCC. MCC grants are made without considering politics. This is perhaps the most innovative aspect of MCC, as previous foreign aid missions were plagued by political considerations. The focus of the MCC is to promote economic growth in the recipient countries. The program emphasizes good economic policies in recipient countries, such as free markets and low corruption.

The indicators are:

An eligible country must apply for a grant with a specific project in mind.

Countries and country tools 
Compact countries

 
 
 
 
 
 
 
 
 
 
 
 
 
 
 
 
 
 
 
 
 
 
 
 
 
 
 
 
 
 
 
 
 

Threshold countries

MCC compacts and thresholds programs in recipient countries 
MCC signs either a compact or a threshold agreement with a partner country. A compact is awarded if the country scores highly on the selection criteria indicators. If the country scores poorly but has a positive, upward trend on the selection criteria, it can still be eligible for a smaller grant, called a threshold program.

MCC requires that each partner government creates a special purpose legal entity that will be accountable for implementing the compact program.

Eligible countries
In the first year (2004), 17 countries were made eligible for an MCC grant: Armenia, Benin, Bolivia, Cape Verde, El Salvador, Georgia, Ghana, Honduras, Lesotho, Madagascar, Mali, Mongolia, Morocco, Mozambique, Nicaragua, Senegal, Sri Lanka, and Vanuatu. Madagascar and Honduras were the first countries to receive actual funding from the MCA. On June 16, 2006, the Gambia was suspended, citing deterioration in 8 of the 16 criteria categories. Mali was approved in October 2006 for a $461 million program to develop modern irrigation systems and an industrial park. Jordan was granted full compact eligibility, despite objections from Freedom House for its lack of full political and civil rights.  MPs in Uganda from the opposition party hailed their country's rejection from full compact status, demanding instead a stronger effort in stopping the corruption that disqualified their country. In June 2007, MCA-eligible countries in Africa held a meeting in Accra, Ghana, to discuss their experiences. Malawi qualified for a full compact in 2007, while Mauritania became threshold eligible.

Threshold eligible
Several countries were chosen in 2004 for a new part of the program called Threshold Program Assistance, which are smaller compacts used to assist a country close to meeting account eligibility to become eligible for a full program. Jordan received a Threshold program aimed at democracy and trade totaling $25 million. Yemen was previously eligible for a threshold agreement, but was suspended after their indicators fell too low to qualify. But having successfully competed a democratic election and various economic reforms, the MCC made Yemen eligible again for a threshold agreement. On December 12, 2007, the MCC Board selected Malawi for a compact and Mauritania for a threshold agreement, as well as allowing Albania, Paraguay, and Zambia to submit a first ever second stage threshold agreement. In 2007 the U.S. Ambassador to Swaziland highlighted the progress on the MCC indicators over the last few years and encouraged the country to work toward eligibility.

A full listing of MCC partner countries can be found at https://web.archive.org/web/20130101234121/http://www.mcc.gov/pages/countries. MCC's portfolio focuses mostly on African nations.

Funding
Congress has consistently provided less funding for the program than the president has requested. In fiscal year 2004, $650 million were provided for the program, with an increase up to $1.5 billion the next year. For fiscal year 2007, $2 billion were provided, a 14% increase over the previous year but still under the $3 billion target. Again for fiscal year 2008, less funding will be provided than was hoped for, and only $1.2 billion was budgeted; the CEO of the MCC commented that it would undercut the program's efforts. Congress declined to re-authorize the program, which technically was not needed since the program had been authorized already, but also since there was argument over the authorization language. In discussions of the FY 2009 budget, the United States Senate proposed that only half of the money needed for a compact be provided up front, as opposed to full funding for each one provident in advance, which officials at the corporation insist would be a "large step backward" causing too little aid to make an impact on recipient countries. Senator Richard Lugar, the author of the amendment, responded that more "realistic" funding levels allowed for more compacts, thus spreading the "MCC effect".
The amendment did not make it into the final bill. President Bush's FY 2008 budget requested $2.225 billion, the first time since the program's inception that the amount was not $3 billion, and enough money for five compacts, several threshold agreements and administrative funding.

Reception and impact
Studies by groups such as the conservative Heritage Foundation in the United States have shown that many developing countries that have received foreign aid have seen their per capita income fall or stagnate over the last 40 years. The Heritage Foundation has consistently supported the MCC's approach, which has used their trade measure from the Index of Economic Freedom. In April 2005, the United States Government Accountability Office issued a favorable report about the work of the MCC and its work thus far. The Program Assessment Rating Tool (PART), which reviews the efficiency and results produced by U.S. government programs, was scheduled to be reviewed in 2007. A study in 2006 looking at the "MCC effect" estimated that potential recipient countries improved 25% more on MCA's criteria than other countries, after controlling for time-trends. The World Policy Council, headed by Ambassador Horace Dawson and Senator Edward Brooke, recognizes the MCC as the most recent and most promising program in its area, and recommended that the Bush administration and the Congressional Black Caucus focus on full funding and an accelerated pace of spending. Doing Business 2007 cited the Millennium Challenge Accounts as a catalyst for reforms underway in 13 countries. Also, Freedom House released subcategories for the first time since it was being used as part of the MCC's measurements to allow for more granular distinctions. Also, the number of days it takes to start a business in low and low-middle income countries has decreased significantly since 2002, which is one of the factors the accounts measure since rapid business registration is thought to increase economic activity.

Some critics have charged that the program uses indicators by conservative groups such as the Heritage Foundation and is therefore biased toward free market economics and reimposing American imperialism on the Global South. The program is said to have resulted in countries receiving less funding from other U.S. government development organizations and not more. Some development agencies have felt frozen out of the process since the compact programs are designed primarily by the country involved. Implementation has been difficult in Armenia, and concern about its effectiveness has been expressed.

In February 2020, the Cabinet of Sri Lanka said it would not sign the proposed MCC agreement in its present form. A committee of experts had determined that it contained clauses incompatible with the Constitution of Sri Lanka and was "detrimental" to the country's sovereignty. After a board meeting on 15 December 2020, the MCC announced the withdrawal of its proposal for a compact with Sri Lanka.

See also
 Millennium Challenge Corporation’s Nepal Compact
 Title 22 of the Code of Federal Regulations

Notes

References

External links

 Official Website
 Millennium Challenge Corporation. Congressional Research Service
 Millennium Challenge Corporation in the Federal Register

2004 establishments in the United States
International development agencies
United States foreign aid
Foreign relations of the United States